Stoltenberg is a Norwegian family known for its politicians, including two previous government ministers, Minister of Foreign Affairs Thorvald Stoltenberg and Prime Minister Jens Stoltenberg, the latter of whom currently serves as Secretary General of NATO.

Various branches of the family have long political traditions. The family may be traced back to Henrich Mogenssen Stoltenberg (fl. around 1590), who was a churchwarden in Tønsberg. Henrich Mogenssen was the great-grandfather of Vincent Stoltenberg (1694-1763) and Jens Stoltenberg (1676-1725), a merchant and a priest, respectively.

The name Stoltenberg derives from the village Stoltenberg in present-day Germany. While living as a student in Holstein, one of the Stoltenberg family's ancestors adopted this name.

Prominent members 
Carl Peter Stoltenberg (1770–1830), participant at the Norwegian Constituent Assembly
Camilla Stoltenberg (born 1958), physician and researcher
Jens Stoltenberg (born 1959), former Prime Minister of Norway, now Secretary General of NATO
Karin Stoltenberg (1931–2012; née Heiberg), former State Secretary
Mathias Stoltenberg (1799–1871), painter
Nini Stoltenberg (1963–2014), noted recreational drug user and television personality
Robert Stoltenberg (born 1965), comedian
Thorvald Stoltenberg (1931–2018), former Foreign Minister, Defense Minister and President of the Norwegian Red Cross

References 

Norwegian families